Falkenfels is a municipality in the district of Straubing-Bogen in Bavaria, Germany.  The English meaning of the name is "Falcon Cliff".

References

Straubing-Bogen